Panther Creek is a stream in the U.S. state of Washington. It is a tributary of the Wind River.

Panther Creek was named for the fact an early settler encountered a panther near the creek.

See also
List of rivers of Washington

References

Rivers of Skamania County, Washington
Rivers of Washington (state)